Gawthwaite is a village in Cumbria, England. It is on the Grize Beck stream, on the edge of Lake District National Park.

Gawthwaite High Quarry is in the vicinity.

Before it became the A5092, the road through the village was the B5280: this can still be seen on the two village roadsigns, which are clearly visible on Google Street View.

References

Villages in Cumbria
South Lakeland District